Lindell Cooley (born February 3, 1963) is a pastor, Christian singer and was worship leader of the Brownsville Revival in Pensacola, Florida.  

He is known for his soulful gospel and rock-infused contemporary worship music.

Cooley currently serves as president of Music Missions International (MMI) and pastor  at Grace Church in Nashville, Tennessee.

Biography
Raised as the only child of a minister in Northern Alabama, Lindell Cooley was surrounded by ministry and music throughout his formative years. His first practical musical experience came when he was taught to play the tambourine at the age of five. From there, he went on to play the drums, bass guitar, organ and piano.

Nearly three decades later, he currently serves as president of Music Missions 
International (MMI) and pastor at Grace Church: Nashville in Franklin, Tennessee.

Looking back on his early days as a budding musician and worship leader, Cooley is still surprised by the orchestrating hand that carefully prepared him for his current position. “My family and I often did concerts in addition to regular church services,” he recalls. “It was when they needed to produce a custom recording for radio stations that I learned to make records.”

At 21, Cooley was spending part of his time playing the piano with Christian musicians Lenny LeBlanc and Rusty Goodman and the other part serving as associate and children's pastor in his father's church. But he knew he had a destiny to fulfill and, at the age of 28, he set off to find it.

Cooley moved to Nashville, Tennessee, and began working at Christ Church as an assistant music minister. Two years later, he left Christ Church to become a studio musician and an independent producer. In the fall of 1994, Lindell Cooley visited Brownsville Assembly and met with Pastor John Kilpatrick. In February 1995, Kilpatrick needed a music minister and said Lindell was God's choice for the position. After initially turning down the job, Cooley accepted and arrived in April 1995. Two months later, while Lindell was away on a missions trip to Ukraine, a historic revival began.  When Lindell returned to Brownsville, he was instrumental in creating the music and songs that became associated with the unusual move of God.  His style of musical leadership during the Brownsville Revival would inform the following generation to a significant degree.

After 10 years as music minister for the Brownsville Revival, In January 2004, Lindell moved back to Nashville, TN and began to plant Grace Church: Nashville. He currently resides in Franklin, TN with his wife Amber and two sons, Samuel and Isaac.

Discography

Notes and references

External links
Official Website
Music Missions International, The Ministry of Lindell Cooley
Grace Church Nashville - Lindell's Church

1963 births
Living people
People from Red Bay, Alabama
American gospel singers